Mehrdād Bahār (b. 1929, in Tehran; d. 13 November  1994, in Tehran) was a prominent Iranist, linguist, mythologist and Persian historian.

Early life
Mehrdad Bahar, was the youngest son of Persian poet Mohammad Taghi Bahar. He held a Ph.D. in Persian literature and Ancient Iranian languages from Tehran University. He received an MA degree in "Ancient and Medieval Persian history" from the University of London where he studied with Professor Mary Boyce at the School of Oriental and African Studies. He began his career as a linguist with focus on Middle Persian. Later in his career he became interested in Persian mythology. He developed theories on ancient roots in Persian culture.

Works

His works on Persian mythology are mainly focused on major non-Aryan/Iranian influences, most of all Mesopotamian mythologies.

Mehrdad Bahar's most notable work is his translation of the well-known Middle Persian text, Bondahesh(n). His other prominent work, A Research on Persian Mythology (two volumes) consists of a collection/compilation of different Zoroastrian Middle Persian texts and a systematic analysis of their roots. The second volume, however, was incomplete when Bahar died in 1994. His closest colleague, Katayun Mazdapour, completed the editing task the following year.

Bibliography
Among his books are
 Bondahesh ( "بندهش"),
 Iranian Mythology ("استوره‌شناسی ایران"),
 A Research on Persian Mythology ( "پژوهشی در استوره‌شناسی ایران"),
 Treaties on Persian Culture ( "جستاری چند در فرهنگ ایران")
 Notes on Shahnameh ("سخنی چند درباره شاهنامه").
 Persepolis by Mehrdad Bahar, N. Kasraian (Photographer)

See also
Persian mythology
Iranian Studies

External links
Mehrdad Bahar: Distinguished Iranologist and  Persian mythologist

Iranian Iranologists
20th-century Iranian historians
Linguists from Iran
1929 births
1994 deaths
20th-century linguists
Zoroastrian studies scholars
Faculty of Letters and Humanities of the University of Tehran alumni
20th-century translators